The 2010–11 season was Leicester City F.C.'s 106th season in the English football league system and their 59th (non-consecutive) season in the second tier of English football. They played their second consecutive season in the Football League Championship after being promoted from League One in the 2008–09 season.

After two seasons in charge, Nigel Pearson left the club in the summer to take the vacant managerial position at Hull City. Former Portuguese international Paulo Sousa was named as Pearson's replacement, joining from Swansea City to become Leicester's first ever non-British or Irish manager. However, he was sacked after just nine league games in charge, after a dreadful start saw Leicester sit bottom of the league. Chris Powell and Mike Stowell took temporary charge, before former England manager Sven-Göran Eriksson was announced as Leicester boss on 3 October.

Leicester's form improved under Eriksson and a good run after the new year saw Leicester reach 7th place and briefly flirt with hopes of reaching the play-offs, however a run of just 2 wins in 11 league games between 22 February-22 April saw these hopes all but extinguished and Leicester eventually ended up finishing mid-table.

Pre-season

Pre-season events
Note: This section does not include close season transfers or pre-season match results, which are listed in their own sections below.
17 May 2010 – Aman Verma signs a new contract for an undisclosed length.
25 May 2010 – It is announced that chairman Milan Mandarić will be facing a second charge for tax evasion for his time at Portsmouth, after a previous charge of cheating the public revenue.
28 May 2010 – Andy King signs a new four-year deal.
10 June 2010 – Reserve team manager Gerry Taggart joins Oldham Athletic as assistant manager.
25 June 2010 – Nolberto Solano announces that he will retire at the end of the season.
29 June 2010 – Manager Nigel Pearson leaves the club to join Hull City on a 3-year contract.
30 June 2010 – Chris Powell is put in temporary charge of the club as caretaker manager.
7 July 2010 – Paulo Sousa is announced as Leicester's 11th permanent manager in ten years after joining from Swansea City
13 July 2010 – It is announced that Chris Powell has retired as a professional footballer, though he still remains a member of the club's coaching staff.

Kit and sponsorship
On 12 July 2010, the club announced a three-year deal with Swiss company BURRDA as the official kit supplier. The kit remained without a sponsor for the 2010–11 season and featured a tradition royal blue and white home kit, with an all-yellow away kit and a black third kit with a sky blue sash.

Friendlies

Events
Note:This section does not include transfers or match results, which are listed in their own sections below.
12 August 2010 – A takeover of the club by an international consortium is finalised.
25 August 2010 – The takeover of the club announced 13 days previous has not yet been ratified by The Football League as the owners have not passed a "fit and proper persons" test.
23 September 2010 –  Lloyd Dyer signs a new four-year contract.
1 October 2010 – Paulo Sousa is sacked as manager after just nine league games in charge.
3 October 2010 – Sven-Göran Eriksson is named as new manager.
4 October 2010 – Leicester City fly to Bangkok for a week long tour of Thailand during an International break in the season. A friendly is arranged against the Thailand National Football Team
21 October 2010 – Steve Howard extends his contract to June 2012.
22 October 2010 – The takeover by Thai-based consortium Asia Football Investments is officially ratified by The Football League.
30 November 2010 – Milan Mandarić resigns as club chairman.
14 January 2011 – Chris Powell, the club's first team coach, joins Charlton Athletic as manager
20 January 2011 – Bruno Berner signs a one-year contract extension.
3 February 2011 – Dietmar Hamann is recruited as first team coach.
10 February 2011 – Vichai Raksriaksorn is named as the new chairman.
14 March 2011 – Jeffrey Schlupp signs a new contract until June 2013.
15 Match 2011 – Paul Gallagher signs a new contract until 2015.
17 March 2011 – Academy players Adam Smith and George Taft sign professional deals.
18 March 2011 – Richie Wellens signs new contract until 2014.
24 March 2011 – Matt Oakley signs a new contract until 2012.
7 April 2011 – Franck Moussa signs new contract until 2013.
15 April 2011 – Andy King signs a one-year contract extension keeping him at the club until 2015.

Club

Players

Current squad
As of 26 April 2011. Note: This is the squad that Leicester finished the season with

Out on loan

Backroom staff

Transfers

In

Out

Loans in

Loans out

Released

Results

Football League Championship

FA Cup

League Cup

Friendlies

Awards

Club awards
At the end of the season, Leicester's annual award ceremony, including categories voted for by the players and backroom staff, the supporters and the supporters club, saw the following players recognised for their achievements for the club throughout the 2010-11 season.

Divisional awards

Championship statistics

Championship table

Club standings

Results by round

Club statistics
All data from football-league.co.uk

Appearances

Starts + Substitute appearances.
Italics indicates loan player.
Asterisk indicates player left the club mid-season.

|}

Top scorers

Most assists

Disciplinary record
Note: Info on LCFC.com is incomplete, further data retrieved from football-league.co.uk

Overall seasonal record

References

Leicester City F.C. seasons
Leicester City